Achanta is a village in West Godavari district of the Indian state of Andhra Pradesh.

Geography
Achanta is a village located in the Godavari river basin. The nearest train station is Palakollu located at a distance of 13.21 Km.

History

Also known as the Dakshina Kashi, Achanta or previously known as Marthandapuram has a great history. In a Grant inscription found in SrungavarapuKota, dated to 5 A.D, stated that the Grant awardee Mathru Sharma native village is Achanta, reveals village exists at 5 A.D. Several stone inscriptions found on temples in Achanta suggest that it may have served as an important religious center for Eastern Chalukyan Empire (700 AD - 1130A D).

Economy
Achanta consists mostly of agriculturists and small scale traders. Like most villages in Godavari River Delta, farmers manage to cultivate two crops of paddy and one summer crop (usually lintels). Many farm lands are surrounded by Coconut trees and Mango trees. Fridays and Sundays Are market days.

Demographics 

As of the 2011 Census of India, Achanta had a population of 19,507. The total population constitute, 9,786 males and 9,721 females with a sex ratio of 993 females per 1000 males. 1,812 children are in the age group of 0–6 years, with sex ratio of 987. The average literacy rate stands at 76.59%.

References

Villages in West Godavari district